Nine Suitcases is a one-man stage play adapted for theatre and performed by British actor David Prince from the Holocaust memoirs of Béla Zsolt as translated from Hungarian into English by Ladislaus Lob. Music was composed and performed by Bethan Morgan. It was directed by Lynn Hunter.

References

Plays about World War II
Plays about the Holocaust
The Holocaust in Hungary
Plays based on real people
Plays for one performer
British plays
2011 plays